The July 2016 President of the Chamber of Deputies of Brazil election took place on 13 July 2016, during the 55th Legislature of the National Congress. The unusual intra-term election for President of the Chamber of Deputies was necessitated by the impending resignation of Eduardo Cunha from the presidency, on 7 July 2016, after his suspension by the Supreme Federal Court (STF). Cunha was the first president to resign in the middle of a Congressional term since Severino Cavalcanti in 2005.

Background
Democrats's deputy Rodrigo Maia, former leader of the party, won the election in the second round, receiving 285 votes. Social Democratic Rogério Rosso, leader of the party, garnered 170 votes. As 460 deputies cast a vote, the majority needed to win was 231.

Cunha had been president since 1 February 2015, and was target of many accusations of corruption, one of them accusing him of perjury during his hearing in the Petrobras Parliamentary Inquiry Committee (CPI da Petrobras). In the occasion, the deputy affirmed that he didn't have any bank accounts in Switzerland, which was proved true months later, leading to a process which ended in the removal of Cunha from the Chamber. Cunha was suspended from his term as federal deputy by the Supreme Federal Court since 5 May 2016. Ever since, Vice President of the Chamber, Waldir Maranhão, took office as Acting President until Cunha's resignation and subsequent election of Maia.

Formal voting

First round

Notes

References

2016 elections in Brazil
July 2016 events in South America
2016